The Colorado Hunter Jumper Association (CHJA) is a competition-based sport organization within the state of Colorado. CHJA serves many types of riding including hunt seat, equitation, showjumping, dressage, cross country, and eventing.

CHJA has programs throughout the year to include challenges, charity events, networking events, riding clinics, schooling shows, and horse shows. Hunter/jumper horse shows hosted in Colorado are organized through CHJA. Each horse show season lasts from March to October, and points are added up for both riders and horses throughout the season. Only CHJA members and registered horses are eligible to earn points. At the end of each season, awards are presented to riders, horses, and barns/teams based on the total number of points they earned throughout the season.

USEF Alliance Partner 
CHJA is an alliance partner with the United States Equestrian Federation (USEF). This partnership means that the national organization, USEF, recognizes that CHJA is an official working organization that supports the values of USEF. USEF recognizes the "important role each and every equestrian organization plays in representing, shaping, and fostering growth within its respective breed or discipline. USEF Alliance Partners help the Federation fulfill its mission to celebrate, protect, and grow equestrian sport in the United States."

References 

Equestrian organizations